Mesopelex is a genus of small sea snails, marine gastropod mollusks in the family Pseudococculinidae, the false limpets.

Species
Species within the genus Mesopelex include:
 Mesopelex zelandica B.A. Marshall, 1986

References

External links
 To GenBank 
 To ITIS
 To World Register of Marine Species

Pseudococculinidae
Monotypic gastropod genera